Aunt Clara Fork is a  long 3rd order tributary to Kings Creek in Washington County, Pennsylvania.

Variant names
According to the Geographic Names Information System, it has also been known historically as:
Aunt Clara Fork Kings Creek

Course
AUnt Clara Fork rises in a pond about 1.5 miles south of Frankfort Springs, Pennsylvania, and then flows southwest to join Kings Creek about 4 miles northeast of Weirton.

Watershed
Aunt Clara Fork drains  of area, receives about 39.8 in/year of precipitation, has a wetness index of 329.03 and is about 69% forested.

See also
List of Pennsylvania Rivers

References

Rivers of Pennsylvania
Rivers of Washington County, Pennsylvania